Solos Nalampoon (born 2 July 1938) is a Thai former sports shooter. He competed at the 1972 Summer Olympics and the 1976 Summer Olympics.

References

1938 births
Living people
Solos Nalampoon
Solos Nalampoon
Shooters at the 1972 Summer Olympics
Shooters at the 1976 Summer Olympics
Place of birth missing (living people)
Asian Games medalists in shooting
Shooters at the 1970 Asian Games
Solos Nalampoon
Medalists at the 1970 Asian Games
Solos Nalampoon